Abdullah Bagh Kili is a town in the Federally Administered Tribal Areas of Pakistan. It is located at 32°24'7N 69°41'20E with an altitude of 1635 metres (5367 feet).

References

Populated places in Khyber Pakhtunkhwa